Dyschirius macroderus is a species of ground beetle in the subfamily Scaritinae. It was described by Maximilien Chaudoir in 1850.

References

macroderus
Beetles described in 1850